The South Africa women's national field hockey team represents South Africa in international field hockey matches and tournaments.

Tournament history

Summer Olympics

World Cup

Commonwealth Games

Africa Cup of Nations

All-Africa Games

African Olympic Qualifier

World League
 2012–13 – 12th place
 2014–15 – 14th place
 2016–17 – 10th place

Hockey Nations Cup

Champions Trophy
 2000 – 5th place

Champions Challenge

Current squad
The following players represented South Africa at the FIH Nations Cup in Valencia.

Head coach: Giles Bonnet

See also
South Africa men's national field hockey team
South Africa women's national under-21 field hockey team
South Africa women's national under-18 field hockey team

Notes

References

External links

FIH profile

African women's national field hockey teams
Field hockey
National